New Hazelton station is a railway station in New Hazelton, British Columbia. It is on the Canadian National Railway mainline and serves Via Rail's Jasper–Prince Rupert train.

Footnotes

External links 
Via Rail Station Description

Via Rail stations in British Columbia